Mastiff is the third novel in Tamora Pierce's Provost's Dog trilogy, about a young Provost guard-woman in a fantasy kingdom called Tortall. The novel, as with all the Beka Cooper books, is written in first person diary form. The actual diary is said to be written in a mixture of Dog code and Beka's personal code.

Plot Introduction
Three years have passed since Beka Cooper almost died in the sewers of Port Caynn, and she is now a respected member of the Provost's Guard. But her life takes an unexpected turn when her fiancé is killed on a slave raid. Beka is faced with a mixture of emotions as, unbeknownst to many, she was about to call the engagement off.

It is as Beka is facing these feelings that Lord Gershom appears at her door. Within hours, Beka, her partner Tunstall, her scent hound Achoo, and an unusual but powerful mage are working on an extremely secretive case that threatens the future of the Tortallan royal family, and therefore the entire Tortallan government. As Beka delves deeper in the motivations of the criminals she now Hunts, she learns of deep-seated political betrayal and corruption. These are people with power, money, and influence, and they are able to hire the most skilled of mages, well versed in the darkest forms of magic, all of which makes them nearly impossible to identify.

This case—a Hunt that will take her to places she's never been before—will challenge Beka's tracking skills beyond the city walls, as well as her ability to judge exactly whom she can trust with her life and her country's future.

Plot summary
The book opens in the beginning of June 249 H.E. at the funeral of Holborn Staftstall, Beka Cooper's fiancé and a five-year Dog of the Jane Street kennel.  All the Dogs realize that Holborn's impetuous nature got him killed in the line of duty. Beka feels guilty both that she wasn't able to influence him to be more careful and that she was on the verge of ending their relationship. Rosto, the Rogue of Corus and friends, takes care of her that evening.

The next morning, Beka's companion Pounce, a constellation in the form of a cat, wakes her before dawn. Lord Gershom, Beka's patron and the Lord Provost of Tortall, comes with the news that she and her scent hound Achoo are needed on a Hunt. Her partner Matthias Tunstall is at the Peregrine Dock, who will join the Hunt. All that is known is that the Hunt calls for utmost secrecy, a small team, and a scent-hound. A mage magics the Peregrine ship to bounce off the waves, allowing for very fast trips; the ride is so rough that all passengers and crew are tied to bunks/part of the ship, and all but a couple crew members are made to sleep. The ship stops at Blue Harbor to pick up Master Farmer Cape, a Provost's mage unknown to Beka and Tunstall.

The group heads to the Summer Palace, indicating the king is involved as the royal family has been in residence there for a week and a half. The palace is heavily damaged, with many people burned, sword hacked, stabbed, and some even found melted. During the attack, the four-year-old Prince Gareth was kidnapped while the king and queen were away for the evening. Both parents are devastated by the events and reveal that King Roger III is at odds with the Chancellor of Mages (and many other mages and lords) over licensing and taxing mages as well as increasing the taxes on his nobles after the bread riots on 247 H.E. Master Farmer indicates that the protection spells of the palace, which the Chancellor came to renew last month, had instead been shredded. The personal mages of the king and queen, Ironwood and Orielle, were unaware of this damage and are further insulted by the presence of Farmer, as he is not a court mage.

Beka finds laundry with the prince's scent on it and she and Achoo track his trail. They arrive at the beach, where Master Farmer shows he has great talents by creating a light within stones with quartz crystals (for use as a torch) and found two ships recently sunk under the water. Master Farmer, Ironwood, and Orielle raise the ships to shore. Beka and Tunstall search the woods nearby, where Achoo finds the prince's scent again, only for it to end at a riverbank, near the remains of several melted people.

Lord Gershom and Master Farmer, accompanied by guards and Pounce, find Beka's group and are relieved to learn the prince didn't go down in the ships. Beka and Tunstall are given horses and they head back to the palace to consult with the king. Rain comes, which was magicked, and weakens the scent trail of the prince. The royals are informed of the progress before everyone heads to bed. Beka awakes to take Achoo out and finds Tunstall and Master Farmer cooking, as most servants are dead and none of the court know how.

Beka and Achoo head back to the beach, to investigate the ships that were raised. Tunstall finds Beka and Achoo at the ships, where they discover that one of the ships was a slave ship. They also discover powerful mages at work.

Tunstall and Beka are sent to Port Caynn; Farmer later joins them and so does the lady knight Sabine of Macayhill (also Tunstall's lover) joins the Hunt, though Tunstall is still in charge. They receive a lead for their hunt from a Birdie and are taken via Peregrine ship to Arenaver.  As soon as the group docks, Achoo finds the scent again and the hunt continues into the Marshlands, where trail ends at burned down bridge.

After making camp, they then go into village for help getting across the water. The locals are distrustful, but recommend to hire Ormer to take them across the water, which takes four days. At the other side of the Marshlands, Ormer heads back to the village and Achoo picks up the scent of Prince Gareth again near the burned bridge. The trail leads them to a trap which Farmer disarms. 

Achoo leads them into Queensgrace Castle where the cult of the Gentle Mother has a strong following. Beka and Achoo explore while Tunstall and the rest of the Hunt submit to the orders of the Lord of Queensgrace. Beka encounters a few Birdies who help the Hunt, and Beka discovers some of the conspirators and their plan to kill the king, queen, and Prince Gareth in order to place Prince Baird on the throne with the support of the Crown Mages and assorted nobles. 

Leaving Queensgrace, Beka finds the four-leafed insignia of the conspiracy on Farmer's bag and begins to fear there must be a traitor in the group within the Hunt. Beka and the team encounter a variety of traps as they continue to track Prince Gareth. Beka, Tunstall, Sabine, and Farmer get kidnapped by some bandits and mages who had taken part in the kidnapping of Prince Gareth, and all are led to Halleburn Castle where the conspiracy is based. Beka and Farmer get tortured for information, while Sabine turns to the cause of the conspiracy with the promise of marrying Prince Baird and keeping Tunstall as a consort. Farmer gets placed in Beka's cell; they orchestrate an escape to find and rescue Prince Gareth, and they make plans to marry when the hunt is over. Beka and Pounce finds Prince Gareth who is being kept as a kitchen slave, then Farmer catches up, and Sabine, Tunstall, and Nomalla the lady knight of Halleburn rejoin the group declaring their loyalty to King Roger III. 

The group leaves Halleburn together easily, and then the group splits in the midst of a fight so Beka and Gareth continue on alone. Then, Beka encounters Tunstall alone and discovers his plan to marry Sabine by becoming Lord Provost to King Baird. Beka and Tunstall fight, and Beka wins, keeping Tunstall alive to face the Magistrates for treason. Sabine, Farmer, and Nomalla reveal themselves to Beka having heard his plans and treason, and Sabine ties Tunstall to a tree so he must face the Magistrates. The new group loyal to King Roger III then returns to the place where Achoo guards Prince Gareth. The next morning, an army attacks Halleburn with mages. Farmer had gotten a message to his master: "Halleburn." Farmer determines that the army is on the side of King Roger III, and that Halleburn, Queensgrace, and Aspen Vale are all being sieged to stamp out the rebellion.

The king announces that both Prince Gareth and Beka's wish was for the end of the slave trade, which he has them sign as witnesses a proclamation ending enslavement in Tortall. With children no longer able to be sold into slavery, it should end within two generations, as current slaves pass away.

Characters
Rebakah (Beka) Cooper
The main protagonist of the series, Beka narrates the novel from first-person perspective. A determined, strong young woman in her twenties with icy blue-gray eyes and the ability to communicate with the souls of dead people and dust spinners as part of her service to the Black God of death.
Pounce
Beka's cat who has black fur and unusual purple eyes, Pounce is actually the constellation known as the Cat. He can speak and communicate telepathically when he chooses.
Achoo Curlypaws
Achoo is a loyal scent hound for the Provost's Guard in the Lower City. She and Beka have been partners since the events in Bloodhound, and have come to an understanding beyond the commands taught by Phelan of the Provost's Guard: a mangled form of a language known as ‘Kyprish’, the native tongue of the Copper Isles. Lord Gershom has selected her and Beka to come to the hunt.

Matthias (Mattes) Tunstall
The partner of Beka and Achoo. Mattes was one of Beka’s old training partners during her Puppyhood in Terrier. He is six feet and three inches tall, and Beka describes him as prickly and having an owlish look. Throughout the book, Lady Sabine of Macayhill is his lover. Lord Gershom has selected him to join the Hunt for Prince Gareth.

Farmer Cape
A mage of prodigious skill, Farmer hides the bulk of his magical ability by acting silly and untrained. Farmer works for the Provost's Guard in Blue Harbor as a mage. Lord Gershom has selected him to join the Hunt for Prince Gareth. Farmer develops a strong attraction to Beka, and then learns to love her as the story progresses. They end up engaged at the end, much to the horror of Rosto and the glee of Aniki and Kora.
Lady Sabine of Macayhill
A lady knight of Tortall, Sabine is an experienced warrior and a true knight. A lady of noble birth, she is related by blood or marriage to most noble households in Tortall. Lord Gershom has selected her to join the Hunt for Prince Gareth. 
Lord Gershom of Haryse
A nobleman and the Lord Provost of Tortall under King Roger III of Conté, who trusts him explicitly. Lord Gershom is also Beka's patron and adoptive father. He is in charge of the hunt for Prince Gareth.

King Roger III of Conté
The current king of Tortall in the time of Beka. King Roger III is in his forties, and was known as "Randy Roger" during the time of his first marriage to Princess Alysy of Gala for his philandering. He has changed his ways since his marriage to Princess Jessamine of Barzun, and thanks to her has begun taking an interest in the running of his country. He dotes on his young, beautiful wife and their son Prince Gareth.
Queen Jessamine of Conté
The current queen consort of Tortall in the time of Beka, Queen Jessamine is in her twenties and is known for being a great beauty. A kind mother, Queen Jessamine adores her only son Prince Gareth and her husband King Roger III. She takes an active interest in the politics and governance of Tortall and encouraged her husband to do the same.
Crown Prince Gareth of Conté
A young lad of four, Prince Gareth is the heir to the throne of Tortall. He has blond hair, pale and tender skin, and a gentle demeanor. 
Clara (Clary) Goodwin
Beka’s watch Sergeant. Replaced Kebibi Ahuda.

References 
 

2011 American novels
2011 fantasy novels
American fantasy novels
Tortallan books